Arnold is an unincorporated community on the West Fork River in Lewis County, West Virginia, United States.

References 

Unincorporated communities in Lewis County, West Virginia
Unincorporated communities in West Virginia